Santo António da Charneca is a civil parish in the municipality of Barreiro, Portugal. The population in 2011 was 11,536.

References

Parishes of Barreiro, Portugal